Gero I ( 900 – 20 May 965), sometimes called the Great, was a German nobleman who ruled an initially modest march centred on Merseburg in the south of the present German state of Saxony-Anhalt, which he expanded into a vast territory named after him: the marca Geronis. During the mid-10th century, he was the leader of the Saxon Ostsiedlung.

Succession and early conflicts
Gero was the son of Count Thietmar, tutor of Henry I. He was appointed by King Otto I to succeed his brother, Siegfried, as count and margrave in the district fronting the Wends on the lower Saale in 937. His appointment frustrated Thankmar, the king's half-brother and Siegfried's cousin, and together with Eberhard of Franconia and Wichmann the Elder, he revolted against the king (938). Thankmar was dead within a year and his accomplices came to terms with Otto. Gero was kept in his march. 

During the insurrection of his opponents, Gero had been prosecuting a losing war against the Slavs in 937–938. The losses his troops sustained could not be made up for by the produce of the land nor by tribute, since the Slavs refused to pay. As an important marcher lord, Gero's command included , that is, a "military following," "warband of vassals or companions," or "specially chosen group of fighters" differentiated from the rest of the army (exercitus). These men formed the elite of Gero's troops.

Slav campaigns
In 939, an Obodrite attack left a Saxon army routed and its margravial leader dead. Gero in revenge invited thirty Slav chieftains to a banquet whereat he killed all but one, who managed to escape by accident. In response, the Stodorani revolted against German overlordship and chased the Germans across the Elbe, but Gero was able to reverse this before Otto's arrival in Magdeburg later in the year. He subsequently bribed Tugumir, a baptised Slav prince, to betray his countryman and make his people subject to Germany. Soon after, the Obodrites and the Wilzes made submission.

In 954, while Gero was away, the Ukrani (or Ucri) revolted, but Gero returned with Conrad the Red and pacified them.

In 955, some Saxon counts rebelled and were banished by Duke Herman. They found refuge in Swetlastrana, a Slav town, location unknown (maybe current Berlin-Lichtenberg), where the Obodrite chiefs Nakon and Stoinegin (or Stojgnev) resided. There Herman besieged them until an agreement was reached, but an ensuing skirmish spoiled the peace. The Obodrites, Wilzes, Chrepienyani, Redarii and Dolenzi then banded together to oppose the coming army of Gero, the king, and Liudolf, Duke of Swabia. After negotiations failed because of the Germans' harsh terms, the Slavs were defeated in battle on the Drosa. 

Gero participated in general Saxon campaigns against the Slavs in 957, 959, and 960, as well as campaigning against the Wends and forcing Mieszko I of the Polans to pay tribute, grant land lien, and recognise German sovereignty during Otto's absence in Italy (962–963). Lusatia, according to Widukind, was subjected "to the last degree of servitude". Gero was responsible for subjecting the Liutizi and Milzini (or Milciani) and extending German suzerainty over the whole territory between the Elbe and the Bober. In these lands, the native Slavic populace was reduced to serfdom and "tribute-paying peoples" were converted into "census-paying peasants".

Relationship with Church and family
Gero had a close relationship to Otto I. Otto was godfather to Gero's eldest son, Siegfried, and he granted Siegfried the villae of Egeln and Westeregeln in the Schwabengau in 941. As an act of devotion, Gero made a pilgrimage to Rome in 959 after Siegfried's death. In Siegfried's name, in 960, he also founded a Romanesque collegiate church, St Cyriakus, and the abbey of Gernrode, in a forest named after him, Geronisrode (Gernrode), and left a large part of his great wealth to it on his death. The church and abbey were dedicated to St. Cyriacus, and the abbey was a convent, housing nuns and canonesses. 

Gero's second son, Gero II, had already died at that point. The name of Gero's wife has to be hypothesised from libri memoriales: it was either Judith (Iudita) or Thietsuuind (Thietswind).

Death and division of territory

At his death, Gero's march extended as far as the Neisse river. He was not popular with the Saxon nobility of his day, because he had a strong sense of moral rectitude and was of low birth. Nonetheless, he became celebrated in the Nibelungenlied as the marcgrâve Gêre, though it has been disputed whether he was ever officially accorded that title. Gero's tomb can still be see in Gernrode today. A decorative painting was added to it c. 1350. It depicts Gero standing over a vanquished Wend.

After his death, the huge territory he had conquered was divided by Emperor Otto II into several different marches: the Northern March (under Dietrich of Haldensleben), the Eastern March (under Odo I), the March of Meissen (under Wigbert), the March of Merseburg (under Günther) and the March of Zeitz (under Wigger I). Later the Northern March was subdivided into the marches of Landsberg, Lusatia and Brandenburg. 

The division of Gero's "super-march" probably had something to do with its immense size and the political consideration of trying to please many without making enemies. The subdivisions into which it was divided, however, were natural. As early as 963, Lusatia—and even upper and lower Lusatia—and the Ostmark were distinguishable as governable provinces within Gero's march.

See also
Saint Cyriakus, Gernrode

Sources
The primary chronicle sources for Gero's life are those of Widukind of Corvey and Thietmar of Merseburg, on which most of the work in the secondary sources is based. 
 Reuter, Timothy. Germany in the Early Middle Ages 800–1056. New York: Longman, 1991.
 Thompson, James Westfall. Feudal Germany, Volume II. New York: Frederick Ungar Publishing Co., 1928.
 Bernhardt, John W. Itinerant Kingship and Royal Monasteries in Early Medieval Germany, c. 936–1075. Cambridge: Cambridge University Press, 1993.
 Leyser, Karl. "Ottonian Government." The English Historical Review, Vol. 96, No. 381. (Oct. 1981), pp 721–753.
 Leyser, Karl. "Henry I and the Beginnings of the Saxon Empire." The English Historical Review, Vol. 83, No. 326. (Jan. 1968), pp 1–32.
 Lang, Henry Joseph. "The Fall of the Monarchy of Mieszko II, Lambert." Speculum, Vol. 49, No. 4. (Oct. 1974), pp 623–639.
 Dvornik, F. "The First Wave of the Drang Nach Osten." Cambridge Historical Journal, Vol. 7, No. 3. (1943), pp 129–145.
 Jakubowska, Bogna. "Salve Me Ex Ore Leonis." Artibus et Historiae, Vol. 12, No. 23. (1991), pp. 53–65.
 Howorth, H. H. "The Spread of the Slaves. Part III. The Northern Serbs or Sorabians and the Obodriti." The Journal of the Anthropological Institute of Great Britain and Ireland, Vol. 9. (1880), pp 181–232.
 "Gero (Markgraf)." Allgemeine Deutsche Biographie, by the Historischen Kommission of the Bayrischen Akademie der Wissenschaften, Band 9, Seite 38. (retrieved 29 May 2007, 15:09 UTC)
 Genealogie Mittelalter: Mittelalterliche Genealogie im Deutschen Reich bis zum Ende der Staufer. "Die sächsischen Grafen 919–1024." Schölkopf Ruth.
 Medieval Lands Project:

Notes

900s births
965 deaths
Year of birth uncertain
Counts of Germany
Saxon nobility
Gernrode